Kenneth Francis Gibbs, M.A., D.D. (1856–1935) was a Church of England clergyman who served as the Archdeacon of St Albans from 1909 until his death in 1935.

He was born on 2 April 1856, the son of Hucks Gibbs, 1st Baron Aldenham and Louisa Anne Adams. He was educated at Winchester College, Winchester, and followed by graduating from Christ Church, Oxford with Master of Arts (M.A.).

He was appointed vicar of Aldenham, Hertfordshire in 1884.

On 5 June 1894, he married Mabel Alice Barnett, daughter of Charles Edward Barnett and Augusta Rose Walsh. They had seven children: five sons and two daughters.

He was appointed the Archdeacon of St. Albans in 1909, but continued as Vicar of Aldenham until 1913. He was chaplain to King George V in 1921. He was awarded the honorary degree of Doctor of Divinity (D.D.) by Lambeth degree in 1929.

He died on 1 February 1935 aged 78.

References

1856 births
1935 deaths
Archdeacons of St Albans
Alumni of Christ Church, Oxford
People from Aldenham